Bucks Lake (also, Bucks Lodge)  is a census-designated place (CDP) in Plumas County, California, United States. The population was 22 at the 2020 census, up from 10 at the 2010 census.

History
The area was first established as a ranch by Horace Bucklin and Francis Walker in 1850. A hotel and a post office were later built on the site. In 1928, Bucks Storage Dam was built on Bucks Creek, a tributary of the Feather River, creating the Bucks Lake reservoir, inundating the original site of the town.

The Bucks Lake post office operated from 1940 to 1942.

Bucks Lake is now registered as California Historical Landmark #197.

Geography
Bucks Lake is located at  (39.872496, -121.178096).

Demographics

2010
At the 2010 census Bucks Lake had a population of 10. The population density was 1.0 people per square mile (0.4/km). The racial makeup of Bucks Lake was 7 (70.0%) White, 0 (0.0%) African American, 0 (0.0%) Native American, 1 (10.0%) Asian, 0 (0.0%) Pacific Islander, 0 (0.0%) from other races, and 2 (20.0%) from two or more races.  Hispanic or Latino of any race were 3 people (30.0%).

The whole population lived in households, no one lived in non-institutionalized group quarters and no one was institutionalized.

There were 4 households, 1 (25.0%) had children under the age of 18 living in them, 3 (75.0%) were opposite-sex married couples living together, 0 (0%) had a female householder with no husband present, 1 (25.0%) had a male householder with no wife present.  There were 1 (25.0%) unmarried opposite-sex partnerships, and 0 (0%) same-sex married couples or partnerships. 0 households (0%) were one person and 0 (0%) had someone living alone who was 65 or older. The average household size was 2.50.  There were 4 families (100% of households); the average family size was 2.25.

The age distribution was 2 people (20.0%) under the age of 18, 0 people (0%) aged 18 to 24, 2 people (20.0%) aged 25 to 44, 3 people (30.0%) aged 45 to 64, and 3 people (30.0%) who were 65 or older.  The median age was 63.3 years. For every 100 females, there were 100.0 males.  For every 100 females age 18 and over, there were 100.0 males.

There were 261 housing units at an average density of 25.2 per square mile, of the occupied units 4 (100%) were owner-occupied and 0 (0%) were rented. The homeowner vacancy rate was 33.3%; the rental vacancy rate was 0%.  10 people (100% of the population) lived in owner-occupied housing units and 0 people (0%) lived in rental housing units.

2000
At the 2000 census there were 17 people, 7 households, and 4 families in the CDP. The population density was 1.6 people per square mile (0.6/km). There were 253 housing units at an average density of 24.5 per square mile (9.5/km).  The racial makeup of the CDP was 100.00% White.
Of the 7 households 14.3% had children under the age of 18 living with them, 71.4% were married couples living together, and 28.6% were non-families. 28.6% of households were one person and none had someone living alone who was 65 or older. The average household size was 2.43 and the average family size was 3.00.

The age distribution was 17.6% under the age of 18, 5.9% from 18 to 24, 17.6% from 25 to 44, 52.9% from 45 to 64, and 5.9% 65 or older. The median age was 52 years. For every 100 females, there were 54.5 males. For every 100 females age 18 and over, there were 75.0 males.

The median household income was $56,250 and the median family income  was $56,250. Males had a median income of $0 versus $0 for females. The per capita income for the CDP was $23,571. None of the population and none of the families were below the poverty line.

Politics

References

External links
 Camp Timberwolf - A group camp for scout, church or other youth organizations at Lower Bucks Lake
  BucksLake.Net
  Plumas County Visitors Bureau
  Bucks Lake Recreation Area

Census-designated places in Plumas County, California
Census-designated places in California